Faris is a former municipality in Laconia, Peloponnese, Greece. Since the 2011 local government reform it is part of the municipality Sparti, of which it is a municipal unit. The municipal unit has an area of 183.667 km2. Population 3,846 (2011). The seat of the municipality was in Xirokampi.

References

Populated places in Laconia